Ziarat Hissar Baba (زيارت ) is a small village located in the north of Khyber Pakhtunkhwa, Pakistan, at Malakand. The people of the village are mostly the Utmankhel. These people are the inhabitants of the village. Their hospitality is very popular among the province, which makes them unique. Utmankhel are simple in nature and hard working people.

Populated places in Malakand District